Ross Davidson (born 6 September 1989) is an English footballer who play as a midfielder for  side Leek Town.

A youth player at Port Vale, he was a professional at the club from 2008 to 2010. After two loan spells at Stafford Rangers and one at Nantwich Town, he signed permanently with Stafford in 2010. He soon switched clubs to Hednesford Town, before joining Kidsgrove Athletic in 2011. He switched to Leek Town in July 2012, and joined New Mills in December 2012. He moved on to Nantwich Town the following year, before playing for Witton Albion. He returned to Kidsgrove Athletic in November 2014. He spent four years with Kidsgrove, before spending 2018 to 2022 with Trafford. He rejoined Leek Town in January 2022.

Career
Davidson, a product of the Port Vale youth team was handed his professional contract at the end of the 2007–08 season. By his second season he was a first team regular, he received his first sending off against Brentford for a 34th-minute slide challenge on Karleigh Osborne. He received a three match ban, but was supported by his teammates, parents and also a Vale supporting Priest who visited him in the locker room to give Davidson support. Assistant manager Ian Brightwell believed the challenge did not warrant a sending off and the club appealed the ban, to no avail. Despite being a regular in the first half of the season, he played just four games of the 2009 end. He considered leaving the game, but in June 2009 signed a new 12-month deal with the club.

He joined Conference North side Stafford Rangers on loan in August 2009. At the same time he was also transfer listed by Vale manager Micky Adams, along with five other youngsters. With his prospects at Vale Park limited, Rangers were keen to extend the loan deal, after Davidson was impressive in his first six games for the club. However he instead returned to Vale Park. In December that year he joined nearby Nantwich Town on loan, a team mid-table in the Northern Premier League Premier Division. In January the loan deal was extended by a further month. In March 2010 he was informed that he would not be offered a new contract by the "Valiants" at the end of the season, and immediately re-joined Stafford Rangers on loan until the expiry of their contracts.

Expected to join Rangers permanently in summer 2010, Davidson was hopeful of playing higher level football, but did however sign with Rangers. Before the end of the season he switched clubs to Hednesford Town of the Southern League Premier Division. Following defeat in the play-off final to Salisbury City and a second-place finish in the 2010–11 season, Hednesford were moved to the Northern Premier League Premier Division. In summer 2011 he joined Northern Premier League Division One South club Kidsgrove Athletic. The club finished in 13th place in 2011–12. He switched to Leek Town in July 2012, before leaving Harrison Park and moving on to New Mills in December 2012. He joined Nantwich Town of the Northern Premier League Premier Division for the 2013–14 season. He later moved on to Witton Albion, making his debut on 25 March 2014. He played nine games in the 2013–14 season and scored two goals from sixteen games in the 2014–15 campaign. He returned to Kidsgrove Athletic in November 2014. The "Grove" finished 20th in the Northern Premier League Division One South in 2014–15, 15th in 2015–16, and 12th in 2016–17. He scored two goals in the 2016–17 season. Athletic finished 18th in the 2017–18 season.

Davidson signed with Trafford in summer 2018. He scored two goals in twenty games during the 2018–19 season and featured 33 times in the 2019–20 season, which was abandoned due to the COVID-19 pandemic in the United Kingdom. He played nine games in the 2020–21 season, which was also abandoned. He rejoined Leek Town in January 2022, making his second debut for the club almost ten years after his first spell had ended. He featured 13 times in the second half of the 2021–22 season.

Personal life
Born in Burton upon Trent, Davidson attended Thomas Alleyne's High School. He grew up an Arsenal fan.

Career statistics

References

1989 births
Living people
Sportspeople from Burton upon Trent
Black British sportsmen
English footballers
Association football midfielders
Port Vale F.C. players
Stafford Rangers F.C. players
Nantwich Town F.C. players
Hednesford Town F.C. players
Kidsgrove Athletic F.C. players
Leek Town F.C. players
New Mills A.F.C. players
Witton Albion F.C. players
Trafford F.C. players
English Football League players
National League (English football) players
Southern Football League players
Northern Premier League players